Charlotte Upcott (Née Gilmartin born 7 March 1990) is a British short track speed skater who competed at the 2014 Winter Olympics in the 500m and 1500m events.

Background 
Gilmartin was born in Redditch, Worcestershire. She visited an ice-rink for a friend's party in 2001, where a trainer noticed her. She joined the Mohawks Ice Racing Club in Solihull. She is trained by former Olympian Jon Eley.

Career

Sochi Olympic Games 
She came 16th in the 500 metres in Sochi.

Pyeongchang Olympic Games 
The ISU Short Track Speed Skating World Cup 2017-2018, in four rounds, served as the qualifiers for the Short track speed skating at the 2018 Winter Olympics.

In the first round, in Budapest, she finished 13th in the 1500 metres and 11th in the 500 metres. In the second round, in Dordrecht, she finished second in the 1000 metres. She finished 15th in the 1500 mètres. She finished 11th in the 500 metres. In the third round, in Shanghai, she was disqualified in the B final of the 1500 metres, coming 12th. She came 19th in the 1000 metres.

References 

1990 births
Living people
British female short track speed skaters
Olympic short track speed skaters of Great Britain
Short track speed skaters at the 2014 Winter Olympics
Short track speed skaters at the 2018 Winter Olympics
Sportspeople from Redditch
21st-century British women